Leland Gilbert Merrill, Jr. (born October 4, 1920 in Danville, Illinois – died July 28, 2009 in Princeton, New Jersey) was an American wrestler who competed in the 1948 Summer Olympics, for the United States. In 1948, he won the bronze medal in the Freestyle Welterweight competition.

Merrill was West Virginia's first Olympic medal winner in wrestling and the state's first Olympian.

References

External links 
 Olympic Profile
 Obit

1920 births
People from Danville, Illinois
Michigan State University alumni
United States Army officers
Wrestlers at the 1948 Summer Olympics
American male sport wrestlers
Olympic bronze medalists for the United States in wrestling
Rutgers University alumni
2009 deaths
Sportspeople from Illinois
Medalists at the 1948 Summer Olympics
Military personnel from Illinois
20th-century American people
21st-century American people